The Health (Regulation of Termination of Pregnancy) Act 2018 (Act No. 31 of 2018; previously Bill No. 105 of 2018) is an Act of the Oireachtas (Irish parliament) which defines the circumstances and processes within which abortion may be legally performed in Ireland. It permits termination under medical supervision, generally up to 12 weeks' pregnancy, and later if pregnancy poses a serious health risk or there is a fatal foetal abnormality.

Prior to 2018, abortion was legal only where pregnancy presented "a real and substantial risk to the life" of the woman, as mandated by the 1983 Eighth Amendment of the Constitution and regulated by the Protection of Life During Pregnancy Act 2013. A referendum on 25 May 2018 approved the Thirty-sixth Amendment of the Constitution, which in effect repealed the Eighth Amendment and empowered the Oireachtas to legislate for abortion. The Health (Regulation of Termination of Pregnancy) Bill was published on 27 September 2018 and signed into law on 20 December 2018. The act came into force on 1 January 2019.

Key provisions
The law allows for a termination:
under section 9, where there is a serious risk to the life or of serious harm to the health of a pregnant woman, after examination by 2 medical practitioners;
under section 10, in cases of emergency, where there is an immediate serious risk to the life or of serious harm to the health of a pregnant woman, after an examination by one medical practitioner;
under section 11, where two medical practitioners are of the opinion formed in good faith that there is present a condition affecting the foetus that is likely to lead to the death of the foetus either before, or within 28 days of, birth; and
under section 12, where there has been a certification that the pregnancy has not exceeded 12 weeks, and after a period of 3 days after this certification.
Under section 23, it is an offence punishable by a fine or imprisonment of up to 14 years to intentionally end the life of a foetus outside the provisions of the Act. This offence does not apply in the case of a woman ending her own pregnancy.

Background

Prior to 2018, abortion was legal only where pregnancy presented "a real and substantial risk to the life" of the woman, as mandated by the 1983 Eighth Amendment of the Constitution and regulated by the Protection of Life During Pregnancy Act 2013. After the 2016 general election, a Citizen's Assembly was established by Oireachtas resolution and tasked with reporting on several issues, the first being "the Eighth Amendment of the Constitution". It began discussion in November 2016 and finally voted in April 2017 on a range of questions. Its first recommendation was to replace the constitutional prohibition with a mandate for the Oireachtas to legislate on abortion. It then provided a range of recommendations for circumstances in which the Oireachtas might legislate to allow abortion. The assembly's formal report was laid before the Oireachtas on 29 June 2017 and referred to a special Oireachtas Joint Committee for consideration. The committee met from September to December 2017 and produced its own report, recommending the same constitutional amendment as the assembly but a slightly more liberal statutory regime. The assembly had recommended allowing termination on grounds of rape or incest, but the committee felt it would be impossible to provide adequate proof for such cases and instead opted for an unrestricted provision of termination within 12 weeks' gestation. Their report was debated in the Dáil between 17 and 25 January 2018 and again on 21 February. Simon Harris, the Minister for Health, began by saying:
I want to recognise that the recommendations contained in the Committee’s report represent the views of the majority of members, but that there was not unanimous agreement on them. I respect the views of those who dissent from the recommendations but I do believe they are the basis on which we must proceed on this issue.
A referendum on 25 May 2018 approved the Thirty-sixth Amendment of the Constitution, which in effect repealed the Eighth Amendment and empowered the Oireachtas to legislate for abortion. Legal challenges delayed enactment of the amendment until 18 September 2018.

Legislative history
A General Scheme of a Bill to Regulate Termination of Pregnancy was published by the Department of Health in March 2018, prior to the passage of the Thirty-sixth Amendment. A second general scheme for the bill was published by the Department of Health in July 2018.

The Health (Regulation of Termination of Pregnancy) Bill was introduced into the Dáil Éireann on 27 September 2018 by the Minister for Health Simon Harris. It passed final stages in the Dáil on 5 December, where it was approved by 90 votes to 15, with 12 registered abstentions. Peadar Tóibín was suspended from Sinn Féin for defying the party whip to vote against the bill. He left the party to found Aontú.

On 13 December 2018, the bill passed final stage in Seanad Éireann by 27 votes to 5.

On 20 December 2018, the bill was signed into law by President Michael D. Higgins. On 21 December 2018, the Minister for Health issued the statutory instruments specifying the act's commencement date, and the regulations for certifications, notifications, and reviews of decisions. On 1 January 2019, the act commenced.

Implementation

The first annual report on the Act's operation, covering the calendar year 2019, was laid before the Houses of the Oireachtas on 30 June 2020 by the Minister for Health. The report revealed that in 2019 there had been 6,666 terminations in the State under the Act's provisions, of which 21 were on grounds of risk to life or health.

References

Sources

Citations

External links
Health (Regulation of Termination of Pregnancy) Bill 2018 Includes previous versions of the bill and Oireachtas debates

Abortion in the Republic of Ireland
Irish abortion law
2018 in Irish law
Acts of the Oireachtas of the 2010s